The 1996 Clemson Tigers baseball team represented Clemson University in the 1996 NCAA Division I baseball season. The team played their home games at Beautiful Tiger Field in Clemson, South Carolina.

The team was coached by Jack Leggett, who completed his third season at Clemson.  The Tigers reached the 1996 College World Series, their eighth appearance in Omaha.  They lost twice to Miami (FL), with wins against  and Alabama, to finish with a 2–2 record in Omaha.

Roster

Schedule

References

Clemson
Clemson Tigers baseball seasons
College World Series seasons
Clemson
Clemson baseball